David Elsner (born March 22, 1992) is a German professional ice hockey right winger currently playing for Löwen Frankfurt of the Deutsche Eishockey Liga (DEL).

Playing career
Born in Landshut, Germany, Elsner began his professional career with his hometown team the Landshut Cannibals. He was then drafted 194th overall by the Nashville Predators in the 2010 NHL Entry Draft. Elsner made his DEL debut for ERC Ingolstadt during the 2010-11 DEL season where he played three games and scored one goal.

In 2011, Elsner moved to Canada to play in the Ontario Hockey League for the Sault Ste. Marie Greyhounds for one season before returning to Landshut the following year. On April 26, 2013, Elsner moved to the Thomas Sabo Ice Tigers of the DEL. On May 18, 2015, Elsner returned to Ingolstadt. He would sign a further extension at Ingolstadt in 2016, 2017, and 2019.

Career statistics

Regular season and playoffs

International

See also
List of select Jewish ice hockey players

References

External links
 

1992 births
Living people
German ice hockey right wingers
ERC Ingolstadt players
Jewish German sportspeople
Jewish ice hockey players
ESV Kaufbeuren players
EV Landshut players
Löwen Frankfurt players
Nashville Predators draft picks
Sportspeople from Landshut
Sault Ste. Marie Greyhounds players
Straubing Tigers players
Thomas Sabo Ice Tigers players